Charles de Bourbon, Count of Charolais (19 June 1700 – 23 July 1760) was a French noble. As a member of the reigning House of Bourbon, he was a Prince of the Blood. He was the fifth child and second son of Louis, Prince of Condé and Louise Françoise, Princess of Condé.

Biography

The second son of Louis III, Prince of Condé and Louise-Françoise de Bourbon, Charles de Bourbon-Condé was made governor of Touraine in 1720. He fought in Hungary in the war against the Ottoman Turks and won distinction at the battle of Belgrade. In 1728 he became one of the candidates for the hand of the wealthy heiress Maria Zofia Sieniawska, supported by Louis XV in an attempt to gain a strong position in Poland before the royal election. He was gouverneur of his nephew Louis Joseph, Prince of Condé.

On his death, the county of Charolais reverted to the king. Some years later it was granted to a brother of the future Louis Philippe I.

He was buried at the Église Collégiale Saint-Martin, Montmorency.

Children 
He had two illegitimate children with Marguerite Caron de Rancurel:  
Marie Marguerite de Bourbon (1752–1830); married Denis Nicolas, Comte de Puget.
Charlotte Marguerite Élisabeth de Bourbon (1754–1839); married  (son of Marshal de Lowendal).

Ancestry

References

1700 births
1760 deaths
18th-century peers of France
Counts of Charolais
Charles
People of the Ancien Régime
People of the Regency of Philippe d'Orléans